Albugo ipomoeae-panduratae, or white rust, is an oomycete plant pathogen, although many discussions still treat it as a fungal organism.  It causes leaf and stem lesions on various Ipomoea species, including cultivated morning glories and their relatives.

References

External links 
Index Fungorum
USDA ARS Fungal Database

Further reading 

Water mould plant pathogens and diseases
Albuginaceae